German submarine U-536 was a Type IXC U-boat of Nazi Germany's Kriegsmarine during World War II.

She was laid down at the Deutsche Werft (yard) in Hamburg as yard number 354 on 13 March 1942, launched on 21 October and commissioned on 13 January 1943 with Kapitänleutnant Rolf Schauenburg in command.

U-536 began her service career with training as part of the 4th U-boat Flotilla from 13 January 1943. She was reassigned to the 2nd flotilla for operations on 1 June.

She carried out two patrols, but did not sink any ships. She was a member of one wolfpack.

She was sunk by the British frigate  and Canadian corvette  on 19 or 20 November 1943 while she was attacking Convoy SL 139/MKS 30 northeast of the Azores.

Design
German Type IXC/40 submarines were slightly larger than the original Type IXCs. U-536 had a displacement of  when at the surface and  while submerged. She had two shafts and two  propellers.

U-536 was fitted with six  torpedo tubes (four fitted at the bow and two at the stern), 22 torpedoes, one  SK C/32 naval gun, 180 rounds, and a  SK C/30 as well as a  C/30 anti-aircraft gun. The boat had a complement of forty-eight.

Service history

First patrol
The boat departed Kiel on 1 June 1943, moved through the North Sea, negotiated the gap between Iceland and the Faroe Islands and entered the Atlantic Ocean. She entered Lorient, on the French Atlantic coast, on 9 July.

Second patrol and loss
Her second foray took her as far as the Gulf of St. Lawrence, where she participated in Operation Kiebitz, an unsuccessful attempt to rescue four U-boat commanders from a prisoner of war camp in Bowmanville, east of Toronto. U-536 successfully escaped from a trap carefully laid by the Royal Canadian Navy and Royal Canadian Mounted Police at the point on the New Brunswick coast where she was to pick up the escapees on September 26, 1943.

Thirty-eight men died; there were seventeen survivors.

Wolfpacks
U-536 took part in one wolfpack, namely:
 Schill 2 (17 – 20 November 1943)

See also
 Operation Kiebitz
 Bowmanville POW camp (Battle of Bowmanville)

References

Bibliography

External links

German Type IX submarines
U-boats commissioned in 1943
U-boats sunk in 1943
World War II submarines of Germany
1942 ships
World War II shipwrecks in the Atlantic Ocean
Ships built in Hamburg
U-boats sunk by depth charges
U-boats sunk by British warships
U-boats sunk by Canadian warships
Maritime incidents in November 1943